Tracey Fear  (born 1959) was an Australian-born netball player who played 63 times for New Zealand. In 1999 she was chosen as a member of New Zealand's "Team of the Century". She later worked for Netball New Zealand and was made an Officer of the New Zealand Order of Merit in 2018.

Early life
Tracey Fear was born in Maroochydore in the Sunshine Coast Region, of Queensland, Australia on 19 August 1959. Her mother played netball at state level in Australia, while her father played Australian rules football. She moved to New Zealand in 1974 when her father was posted to the Australian High Commission in New Zealand's capital, Wellington.

Netball career
Fear played her first game for the Silver Ferns, the New Zealand national netball team, against Australia on 10 July 1982. She retired in 1988, being captain of the team in that year. She was a member of the national team in the 1983 World Netball Championships when New Zealand finished second to Australia, and in the gold medal-winning team in the 1987 Championships. Fear also won a gold medal at the  1985 World Games. She usually played in the goal keeper position and formed a dominant defensive pairing for the Silver Ferns with Waimarama Taumaunu.

Coaching career
Fear gained post-graduate diplomas in sports studies and management from the University of Otago and the University of Waikato. She coached the New Zealand A team, the New Zealand Under-21 team, and Waikato Bay of Plenty Magic. In 1995 she started work with Netball New Zealand, first as a netball development officer and then, from 2000, as Netball Director and High-Performance Director. Returning to Australia in 2012, she first worked for Netball New South Wales and then as Director of Sports at the MLC School in Sydney.

Awards
Fear was made an Officer the New Zealand Order of Merit (ONZM) in 2018.

References

Living people
1959 births
New Zealand international netball players
1983 World Netball Championships players
1987 World Netball Championships players
Netball players at the 1985 World Games
Netball players from Queensland
Australian netball players
New Zealand netball players
New Zealand netball administrators
Australian netball administrators
Australian expatriate netball people in New Zealand
Naturalised citizens of New Zealand
Officers of the New Zealand Order of Merit
Waikato Bay of Plenty Magic coaches
New Zealand netball coaches
National Bank Cup coaches